Krasny Buksir is a rural locality (a settlement) in Kirovskoye Rural Settlement, Sredneakhtubinsky District, Volgograd Oblast, Russia. The population was 236 as of 2010. There are 16 streets.

Geography 
Krasny Buksir is located 16 km west of Srednyaya Akhtuba (the district's administrative centre) by road. Morozkino is the nearest rural locality.

References 

Rural localities in Sredneakhtubinsky District